Microsoft's Windows 8 operating system introduced an updated Start menu known as the "Start screen", which uses a full-screen design consisting of tiles to represent applications. This replaced the Windows desktop as the primary interface of the operating system. Additionally, the on-screen Start button was replaced by a hidden button in the corner of the screen; Microsoft explained that the Start button was removed because few people used it, noting the addition of "pinning" apps to the taskbar from Windows 7.

The change was controversial among users, and a market ensued for applications which restore the visible Start button, emulate the previous Start menu design, or allow users to boot directly to the Desktop instead of the Start screen.

The following is a list of Start menu replacements for Windows 8 which have received coverage from third-party sources:

The number of skins in the table givens the number of built-in skins.  If there are downloadable skins, then a "+" is appended to the number to indicate that download extensions are possible.

RetroUI, StartIsBack, Classic Shell, Start8, and Pokki are five of the more notable of these. RetroUI is offered in 33 languages, and also for Windows Server 2012, and adds a taskbar and resizable windows. StartIsBack is also localized. Classic Shell used to be free and open source (now proprietary freeware), major items are localized and installing the Language Pack from Windows Update makes all items fully localized; Classic Shell is also available for Windows 7 and Windows Server, and claims over 25 million downloads. The Pokki download to restore the Start menu is free; as of January 2013, it has about 1.5 million users. The Pokki application platform, based on Chromium, enables desktop applications to be built—like mobile apps—using standard web languages like HTML5, CSS3, and JavaScript. It is also available for Windows XP and Windows 7. Pokki has raised $21.5M from investors like Google, Intel, and O'Reilly; its business model is to make a commission on software sold through its app store. Start8 has been downloaded over 5 million times.

See also

 List of alternative shells for Windows

References

External links
 Compare Start Menus:Classic Shell vs StartIsBack, Start8 etc

5 Windows 8 Apps to Bring Back the Start Menu by LAPTOP Magazine

Windows 8
Start Menu replacements for Windows 8